The BMW X6 is a mid-size luxury crossover SUV by German automaker BMW. The BMW X6 is the originator of the sports activity coupé (SAC), referencing its sloping rear roof design. It combines the attributes of an SUV (high ground clearance, all-wheel drive and all-weather ability, large wheels and tires) with the stance of a coupé (styling featuring a sloping roof). It is built in BMW's North American plant in Greer, South Carolina alongside the BMW X5, whose platform it shares. Prior to the release of the X7, the X6 was considered a flagship SUV for BMW.

The first generation (E71) was released for sale in April 2008 for the 2008 model year, while the second-generation X6 (F16) was launched at the Paris Motor Show in 2014. The third-generation X6 was revealed in July 2019.

BMW Concept X6 (2007)

The concept model debuted at the 2007 Frankfurt Auto Show and the production X6 officially debuted at the 2008 North American International Auto Show in Detroit and Montreal International Auto Show. While slightly longer and wider than the X5, it is significantly lower and seated initially only four, and since 2011, optionally five.

First generation (E71; 2008)

E71 development began in 2003 under Peter Tuennermann, after start of E70 X5 development in 2001. Design work by E70 X5 designer Pierre Leclercq was frozen in 2005, with test mules being run from the summer of 2005 and prototypes being tested from late 2006. Production began on December 3, 2007.

The X6 marks BMW's first use of its new Dynamic Performance Control system, which works in unison with xDrive all-wheel drive, both being standard on the X6. DPC is a drivetrain and chassis control system that works to regulate traction and especially correct over- and understeer by actively spreading out drive forces across the rear axle. Torque is distributed not only between the front and rear wheels (xDrive) but also from side to side at the rear, for improved agility and added stability (through the DPC rear axle). This lateral distribution of torque is commonly known as torque vectoring.

The DPC differential features clutch packs on both output sides that are actuated by an electric motor. The clutch pack activates a planetary gearset which causes one wheel to be overdriven. A conventional control system will use the brakes to reduce the speed of the faster moving wheel (which is the one with less traction) and reduce engine power. This leads to increased brake wear and slower than optimal progress. The DPC system speeds up the slower moving wheel (the one with the most traction) in order to maintain stability when needed. For example; while turning, the outer wheel is overdriven to provide greater acceleration using the traction advantage through the dynamic loading of the outboard wheel in cornering. In an oversteer situation, the inner wheel is overdriven to regain traction balance.

X6 M

In April 2009, the X6 M version was announced, with a  version of the BMW S63 4.4-litre twin-turbo V8 engine.

The BMW X6 M and X5 M are the first vehicles from BMW M GmbH to have xDrive all-wheel-drive system and automatic transmissions, and are also crossovers as opposed to passenger cars. The X6 M was unveiled at the 2009 New York Auto Show and first went on sale in September 2009.

The high-performance M derivative features a twin scroll twin turbo version of the 4.4-litre V8 BMW S63 engine with the Cylinder-bank Comprehensive Manifold (CCM).

Other features include 6-speed M Sports automatic transmission with aluminum pull-style paddles on the steering wheel, M Dynamic Mode feature,  lower Adaptive Drive suspension, 4-piston fixed calipers with 15.6" rotor at front and single piston floating calipers with 15.2" rotor at rear, 20-inch alloy wheels with 275/40R20 front and 315/35R20 run flat tires, hill descent control, dynamic stability control, special gills in the front fenders, 20-inch light-alloy wheels.

M Performance Parts were available for the X6 M. These include black kidney grilles, a carbon fibre spoiler, steel pedals, a sport steering wheel and M rims.

ActiveHybrid X6 (E72)

The BMW Concept X6 ActiveHybrid is the concept vehicle of BMWs first full-hybrid vehicle and was revealed at the Internationale Automobil-Ausstellung Frankfurt in September 2007. BMWs first mild-hybrid BMW Concept 7 Series ActiveHybrid Generation 1 was revealed at the Paris Motor Show in October 2008. Both cars made their market debuts at the end of 2009 and the X6 Hybrid can drive in pure electrical mode at low speeds. The Active Hybrid 7 Generation 1 does not have this ability.

The BMW Concept X6 ActiveHybrid uses the V8 Twin Turbo with High Precision Injection that powers the BMW X6 xDrive50i.

A defining feature of the BMW Concept X6 ActiveHybrid is its Two-Mode active transmission, an innovative technology that controls the interplay of the electrical motors and the internal combustion engine. The car can operate in two modes: mode 1 delivers high torque when pulling away from a standing start and at low speeds, while mode 2 is suited for higher speeds. The result is that the car always uses the available power resources in the most efficient possible way, whatever speed it is travelling at.

The ActiveHybrid X6 made its world premiere at the Frankfurt Motor Show (IAA) in September 2009.

In late 2009, BMW introduced an X6 featuring a version of the Global Hybrid Cooperation hybrid vehicle drivetrain, popularly known as the two-mode hybrid system. This car was confirmed as being called the BMW ActiveHybrid X6, and it is the world's most powerful hybrid vehicle; it is not sold in the UK. The production vehicle was unveiled alongside a 7 Series hybrid at the 2009 Frankfurt Motor Show.  The ActiveHybrid X6 went on sale in December 2009 in the US market with a base price of US$89,765.

The drive system featured in the BMW ActiveHybrid X6 consists of a  V8 power unit with BMW TwinPower Turbo Technology and two electric engines developing  and, respectively, .

BMW ActiveHybrid technology offers the driver three significant options: to drive under electric power alone, to use the power of the combustion engine, or to benefit from the combination of both drive modes for short periods of maximum acceleration, using the  maximum. The hybrid also employs stop-start technology and other energy saving measures to help improve efficiency. The core-vehicle is however very heavy and the petrol power unit limits the extent to which fuel consumption can be reduced in absolute terms. The Turbo-Diesel models in the X6 range use less fuel, for example.

Engines
The base model is the X6 xDrive35i which is powered by the 225 kW version of the N54 3.0-litre twin-turbocharged inline-six gasoline engine. The top-of-the-line model is the xDrive50i which uses the N63 V8 engine, producing .

At launch, the X6 was available in many markets with two diesel variants: the xDrive30d and xDrive35d, respectively. The second of these power units formed the basis of BMW's diesel launch in all 50 states in late 2008.

By 2010, a new 40d was added to the range, replacing the 35d, and in 2012 a new high-performance M50d was added, but despite its nomenclature, is still powered by a 3.0-litre engine.

Petrol engines

Diesel engines

Second generation (F16; 2015)

The second generation X6 was launched at the 2014 Paris Motor Show featuring a new eight-speed automatic transmission and a slightly larger luggage bay. Sales in most markets commenced by the end of 2014.

The X6 M (F86) BMW M performance model was unveiled in Losail International Circuit in Qatar, and is one of the quickest vehicles of its type.

M Performance Parts can be fitted to 25-50 models with the M Sport trim.

Full M models have their own M Performance Parts. These include black kidney grilles, a carbon fibre gear selector, a sport steering wheel, carbon fibre mirrors, black side vents, carbon fibre trim and fuel filler cap.

Standard trim BMW X6 F16 models get softer and more comfortable suspension and tire setup with a more executive design and the addition of optional side steps.

Petrol engines

Diesel engines

Third generation (G06; 2020)
The third-generation X6 was unveiled on 3 July 2019 and sports more aggressive bodywork including an angular grille which can be illuminated as an option for the first time on a BMW. An M50i performance model is also new, replacing the xDrive50i model. The headlights mirror those on the X5, but the bumper designs and taillights are unique to the X6. Inside, a panoramic roof is standard, and 83 percent larger than the previous X6's. Sales began in November 2019. The X6 M and X6 M Competition performance models were revealed on 1 October 2019.

Development and launch 
The G06 X6 is based on the CLAR platform and features a double wishbone front suspension and five-link rear suspension. Compared to its predecessor, it is  longer,  wider, and  lower. All G06 X6 models adhere to the Euro 6d-Temp emissions standard.

At the 2019 Frankfurt Motor Show BMW unveiled a G06 with Vantablack paint. However BMW does not plan on producing the color on production models.

Awards 

 In January 2021, the X6 xDrive30d M Sport was named Coupé SUV of the Year by What Car? magazine. What Car? awarded the X6 four stars out of five in its review of the car.

Equipment 
The G06 X6 is available in xLine or M Sport trim. xLine models feature 19-inch wheels, chrome trim, and underbody protection. M Sport models feature gloss black trim, M Sport styling, M Sport Suspension, and M Sport brakes. M50i and M50d models also feature an M Sport exhaust and an electronically controlled limited slip differential. All models feature LED headlights, welcome light carpet, and iDrive 7.0 with two 12.3-inch displays and the BMW personal digital assistant.

The G06 X6 can also be optioned with Reverse Assistant, which memorises the last 50 meters travelled and can automatically reverse in that path.

30-40 models with the M Sport trim and M50 Models can be fitted with M Performance Parts. These include a carbon fibre spoiler, M rims, a sport steering wheel, a carbon fibre kidney grille, carbon fibre mirrors and carbon fibre side skirts.

Full M specific M Performance Parts can be fitted to all X6 M models. These include carbon fibre kidney grilles, a carbon fibre diffuser, a carbon fibre spoiler and a sport steering wheel.

Petrol engines

Diesel engines

Production and sales

References

External links

 Official website

Cars introduced in 2007
X6
Crossover sport utility vehicles
Luxury crossover sport utility vehicles
Luxury sport utility vehicles
All-wheel-drive vehicles
2010s cars
Motor vehicles manufactured in the United States